Calosoma linelli is a species of ground beetle in the subfamily of Carabinae. It was described by Mutchler in 1925.

References

linelli
Beetles described in 1925